Sigma Alpha Epsilon Fraternity House may refer to:

Sigma Alpha Epsilon Fraternity House (Moscow, Idaho), listed on the U.S. National Register of Historic Places (NRHP)
Sigma Alpha Epsilon Fraternity House (Champaign, Illinois), listed on the NRHP
Sigma Alpha Epsilon Fraternity House (Columbia, Missouri), listed on the NRHP

See also
Sigma Alpha Epsilon